World of Wonders is the fifteenth full-length album by Canadian singer-songwriter Bruce Cockburn. The album was released in 1986 by True North Records. A video for "Call it Democracy" was produced, and received a moderate amount of airplay on MTV.

Reception

In a retrospective review, Allmusic critic Brett Hartenbach wrote the album, "Whereas that record's best moments centered around his time in Central America, World of Wonders takes you across the globe, through Berlin, Chile, parts of the Caribbean, and North America. Along the way, Cockburn, who has always been intrigued by life's contradictions, is both "dazzled... at this world of wonders" and troubled, "...when life isn't so sweet." Bruce Cockburn is a complex artist writing about complex times, and World of Wonders does a good job of capturing that."

Track listing
All songs written by Bruce Cockburn.
"Call it Democracy" – 3:50
"Lily of the Midnight Sky" – 4:44
"World of Wonders" – 4:45
"Berlin Tonight" – 7:05
"People See Through You" – 3:44
"See How I Miss You" – 4:01
"Santiago Dawn" – 4:47
"Dancing in Paradise" – 5:40
"Down Here Tonight" – 3:54

Personnel
Bruce Cockburn – vocals, electric and acoustic guitars, and charango
Fergus Jemison Marsh – bass, Chapman stick
Hugh Marsh – violin
Jon Goldsmith – keyboards
Chi Sharpe – percussion
Michael Sloski – drums
Michael Alan White – trumpet, flugelhorn, and conch
Sharon Lee Williams – backing vocals
Shawne Jackson – backing vocals
Colina Philips – backing vocals
Kerry Crawford – backing vocals
Judy Cade – backing vocals

Production
Marcel Mousette – translation
Jon Goldsmith, Kerry Crawford – producer
George Whiteside – photography
Bart Schoales – art direction
Bernie Finkelstein – direction

References

1986 albums
Bruce Cockburn albums
True North Records albums